Columbia Games is one of the oldest manufacturers of board wargames, and has also produced the Hârn role-playing game as well as various card games and collectible card games. Their wargames are notable for using small wooden or plastic blocks instead of the more conventional cardboard counters. The company, originally titled Gamma Two Games, started in Vancouver, Canada, but after ten years changed its name to Columbia Games, and eventually moved to Blaine, Washington. It is currently run by founder Tom Dalgliesh and his son Grant.

Gamma Two Games 
In 1971, Tom Dalgliesh, Lance Gutteridge and Steve Brewster all graduated from Simon Fraser University in Vancouver, and decided to start a Canadian games company called Gamma Two Games. They published their first game in 1972, the block wargame titled Quebec 1759. Brewster left the company soon after its formation, and was replaced  by Ron Gibson.

The company produced two more wargames, War of 1812 in 1973, and Napoléon: The Waterloo Campaign, 1815 in 1974.

Although Quebec 1759 eventually sold over 20,000 copies, the next two titles were  not as successful, and the business partners realized there was not much of a market in Canada for board wargames. Starting in 1975, they switched to more family-oriented games such as Airline (1975), Klondike (1975), Supermoney (1978), Smokers Wild (1978), Foreign Exchange (1978), Maneuver (1979), and Score! Soccer Game (1980).

Columbia Games
In 1982, the partners changed the company name to Columbia Games. The following year, Columbia entered the role-playing games market with Hârn, designed by N. Robin Crossby. In the mid-1980s, both Gutteridge and Gibson left the company, leaving Dalgliesh as the sole owner. In 1986, Dalgliesh moved the company just across the American border to Blaine, Washington, where the company could do an efficient mail order business to the much larger American market without the expense of cross-border customs and duties.

The company is still based in Blaine, and Dalgliesh's son Grant is now a member of the company.

The company produces three main types of games:
Block wargames
Role-playing games
Collectible card games (CCGs) and card games

Block wargames 
Gamma Two's first game, Quebec 1759, used embossed wooden blocks rather than cardboard chits. The design proved successful, and after the move to the United States, Columbia designed many more block wargames. Some of these games are designed to introduce new players to the wargaming hobby, but considerably more complex games have been produced, such as EuroFront, a wargame depicting the entirety of World War II in Europe. The relatively expensive embossed wooden blocks originally used in the games have been replaced by plain plastic blocks. Each game comes with a sheet of stickers to affix to the front of the blocks.  

Columbia's list of block games includes:
Quebec 1759, simulating the Battle of the Plains of Abraham during the French and Indian War
War of 1812 (1973), a game based on the War of 1812
Napoléon: The Waterloo Campaign, 1815 (1974)
Rommel in the Desert (1982)
EastFront — the entire Eastern Front of World War II (First edition 1991, and Second Edition 2006)
WestFront: The War in Europe, 1943-45 (1992)
Bobby Lee: The Civil War in Virginia 1861-1865 (1993) 
MedFront: War in North Africa 1940-43 (1994)
Eurofront: War in Europe, 1936-45 (First edition 1995, Second Edition 2006)
Sam Grant: The Civil War in the West 1862-1864 (1997)
Victory: The Blocks of War (1998), a generic World War II strategic, combined arms game
Wizard Kings (2000), — fantasy armies and creatures warring at the strategic level
Pacific Victory: War in the Pacific 1941-45 (First edition 2000, Second edition 2018)
 Hammer of the Scots (2002) — English invasions of Scotland
Liberty: The American Revolution 1775-83 (2003)
 Gettysburg: Badges of Courage (2004) American Civil War
Crusader Rex (2005) — the 3rd Crusade. 
Athens & Sparta (2007) — the Peloponnesian War
Texas Glory (2008), — Texan War of Independence, including the Battle of the Alamo
Richard III: The Wars of the Roses (2009)
Shiloh: April Glory (2010)
Julius Caesar: Caesar, Pompey, and the Roman Civil War (2010)
Shenandoah: Jackson's Valley Campaign (2011)
Borodino: Napoleon in Russia, 1812 (2012)
The Last Spike (2015) — completing the First transcontinental railroad
Victory in Europe (2015) — the European Theater of World War II
Combat Infantry: WestFront 1944-45 (2017) and Combat Infantry: EastFront 1941-43 (2019) — platoon tactics during World War II

Role-playing games

In 1983, Columbia published Hârn, a low-magic fantasy role-playing game campaign setting created by Robin Crossby. The Hârn product line is compatible with Hârn products produced by Kelestia Productions (Crossby's own company) and is supported by additional material produced by the game's fans.

It publishes a set of supplemental materials called HârnQuest.  Each issue is approximately 32 pages and includes articles about Hârnic kingdoms, cities, castles, history, creatures, and other gaming topics. New Hârn Atlas maps are also sent under this subscription as they are released.

Card games 
In the late 1990s, the company began producing collectible card games based upon military themes for the American Civil War (such as Dixie) and the Napoleonic Wars (Eagles: Waterloo).

Slapshot is a card game that focuses on managing a hockey team. Players trade, take, draw new team members and attempt to challenge opponents when they feel their opponents are weak. It is not necessary to know much about hockey to play.

References

External links
 
 

Board game publishing companies
Companies based in Whatcom County, Washington
Publishing companies established in 1970
Role-playing game publishing companies
Wargame companies
1970 establishments in Washington (state)